The 2022 Monterrey Open (also known as the Abierto GNP Seguros for sponsorship reasons) was a women's tennis tournament played on outdoor hard courts. It was the 14th edition of the Monterrey Open and a WTA 250 tournament on the 2022 WTA Tour. It took place at the Club Sonoma in Monterrey, Mexico, from February 28th to March 6th, 2022. During this tournament, the WTA and other international governing bodies of tennis including the ATP did not have players of Russia and Belarus compete under their country flags as a result of the Russian invasion of Ukraine.

Champions

Singles 

  Leylah Fernandez def.  Camila Osorio, 6–7(5–7), 6–4, 7–6(7–3)

Doubles 

  Catherine Harrison /  Sabrina Santamaria def.  Han Xinyun /  Yana Sizikova, 1–6, 7–5, [10–6]

Points and prize money

Point distribution

Prize money 

*per team

Singles main draw entrants

Seeds 

1 Rankings as of February 21, 2022.

Other entrants 
The following players received wildcards into the main draw: 
  Emma Navarro 
  Marcela Zacarías 
  Renata Zarazúa

The following player received a special exempt into the main draw:
  Wang Qiang

The following players received entry from the qualifying draw:
  Sara Errani 
  Dalma Gálfi 
  Jule Niemeier 
  Diane Parry 
  Harmony Tan 
  Viktoriya Tomova

The following player received entry as a lucky loser:
  Lucia Bronzetti
  Seone Mendez

Withdrawals 
Before the tournament
  Anhelina Kalinina → replaced by  Wang Xinyu
  Anna Kalinskaya → replaced by  Lucia Bronzetti
  Magda Linette → replaced by  Magdalena Fręch
  Anastasia Pavlyuchenkova → replaced by  Panna Udvardy
  Rebecca Peterson → replaced by  Heather Watson
  Yulia Putintseva → replaced by  Marie Bouzková
  Emma Raducanu → replaced by  Kamilla Rakhimova
  Sloane Stephens → replaced by  Seone Mendez
  Ajla Tomljanović → replaced by  Anna Karolína Schmiedlová

Doubles main draw entrants

Seeds 

 Rankings as of February 21, 2022.

Other entrants 
The following pairs received wildcards into the doubles main draw:
  Fernanda Contreras /  Marcela Zacarías
  Bianca Fernandez /  Leylah Fernandez

Withdrawals 
Before the tournament
  Rebecca Peterson /  Anastasia Potapova → replaced by  Anastasia Potapova /  Kamilla Rakhimova
  Daria Saville /  Storm Sanders → replaced by  Emina Bektas /  Tara Moore
  Xu Yifan /  Yang Zhaoxuan → replaced by  Mayar Sherif /  Heather Watson

References

External links 
 Official website

2022 WTA Tour
2022
2022 in Mexican tennis
February 2022 sports events in Mexico
March 2022 sports events in Mexico